The Tartan Pro Tour, currently titled as the Farmfoods Tartan Pro Tour for sponsorships reasons, is a series of developmental golf tournaments played in Scotland. The tour is open to both male and female professionals.

The tour was founded and created by 1999 Open Champion Paul Lawrie in 2020. The tour was formed during the COVID-19 pandemic and was created to give UK-based professionals playing opportunities, especially as the PGA EuroPro Tour had cancelled its 2020 season.

In December 2022, it was announced that the Tartan Pro Tour, as well as the Clutch Pro Tour would become official feeder tours to the Challenge Tour; in place of the now defunct PGA EuroPro Tour. The Tartan Pro Tour would offer Challenge Tour status to the leading player on the Order of Merit.

2023 season

Schedule
The following table lists official events during the 2023 season.

2022 season

Schedule
The following table lists official events during the 2022 season.

2021 season

Schedule
The following table lists official events during the 2021 season.

Order of Merit
The Order of Merit was based on prize money won during the season, calculated in Pound sterling.

2020 season

Schedule
The following table lists official events during the 2020 season.

Order of Merit
The Order of Merit was based on prize money won during the season, calculated in Pound sterling.

Order of Merit winners

Notes

References

External links

Professional golf tours
Golf in Scotland